Paradiallus is a genus of longhorn beetles of the subfamily Lamiinae, containing the following species:

 Paradiallus albomaculatus Breuning, 1966
 Paradiallus cabigasi Vives, 2017
 Paradiallus flavolineatus Vives, 2017
 Paradiallus irroratus (Heller, 1924) [= ochreostictus, semperi]
 Paradiallus lumawigi (Hüdepohl, 1990)

References

Lamiini